Bass Lake is a census-designated place (CDP) in California and North Bend Townships, Starke County, in the U.S. state of Indiana. The population was 1,195 at the 2010 census. Covering over 1,300 surface acres, Bass Lake is the third-largest natural lake in Indiana.

History
The community was named after the nearby lake which was populated with a large number of black bass. It was formerly called Cedar Lake. 

Author Lew Wallace spent significant time at Bass Lake, where he wrote portions of Ben-Hur: A Tale of the Christ (1880).

A post office was established at Bass Lake in 1892, and remained in operation until it was discontinued in 1948.

Geography
Bass Lake is located at  (41.230719, -86.588194). The lake is distinct in that it sits atop a gentle hill, with its drainage basin sloping away from its shores. 

Demographics

As of the census of 2000, there were 1,249 people, 534 households, and 365 families residing in the CDP. The racial makeup of the CDP was 98.40% White, 0.08% Native American, 0.24% Asian, 0.48% from other races, and 0.80% from two or more races. Hispanic or Latino of any race were 1.12% of the population.

There were 534 households, out of which 23.4% had children under the age of 18 living with them, 56.4% were married couples living together, 9.4% had a female householder with no husband present, and 31.5% were non-families. 27.7% of all households were made up of individuals, and 12.0% had someone living alone who was 65 years of age or older. The average household size was 2.34 and the average family size was 2.85.

In the CDP, the population was spread out, with 20.6% under the age of 18, 7.3% from 18 to 24, 24.7% from 25 to 44, 27.6% from 45 to 64, and 19.9% who were 65 years of age or older. The median age was 43 years. For every 100 females, there were 88.7 males. For every 100 females age 18 and over, there were 88.2 males.

The median income for a household in the CDP was $42,440, and the median income for a family was $47,361. Males had a median income of $37,159 versus $19,318 for females. The per capita income for the CDP was $19,407. About 10.6% of families and 14.7% of the population were below the poverty line, including 35.4% of those under age 18 and 5.5% of those age 65 or over.

Notes

Census-designated places in Indiana
Census-designated places in Starke County, Indiana